The 1980 Italian Grand Prix was a Formula One motor race held on 14 September 1980 at the Autodromo Dino Ferrari in Imola, Italy. It was the twelfth race of the 1980 World Championship of F1 Drivers and the 1980 International Cup for F1 Constructors.

This was the first Formula One World Championship race to be held at Imola (the circuit having hosted the non-championship Dino Ferrari Grand Prix the previous year). It was the only Italian Grand Prix since 1948 not to be held at Monza, which was undergoing refurbishment at the time. The event would return to Monza in 1981, but Imola would remain on the F1 calendar until 2006, hosting the San Marino Grand Prix, and since 2020, the Emilia Romagna Grand Prix.

The race was won by Brazilian driver Nelson Piquet, driving a Brabham-Ford. Piquet won by nearly half a minute from Australian driver Alan Jones, driving a Williams-Ford, with Jones' Argentine team-mate Carlos Reutemann third. The win was Piquet's third of the season and second in succession, and it gave him the lead of the Drivers' Championship by one point from Jones.

Manfred Winkelhock made his debut, substituting for the injured Jochen Mass at Arrows. A collision with Nigel Mansell's Lotus during qualifying resulted in both drivers failing to make the grid. Ferrari debuted their first turbo car, the 126C, but Gilles Villeneuve started the race in his regular 312T5. Regardless, after a heavy crash in practice at the flat-out right hander before Tosa, reigning World Champion Jody Scheckter announced his retirement from the sport.

The front row of the grid was occupied by the Renaults of René Arnoux and Jean-Pierre Jabouille, although Piquet led by lap 4 and was never headed. On lap 6, Villeneuve crashed his Ferrari heavily at the corner which now bears his name, following a puncture. Villeneuve escaped unhurt, but the incident also caused the retirement of Bruno Giacomelli, who ran over some of the debris in his Alfa Romeo. Jones moved up to second on lap 29 after running as low as seventh. Behind Reutemann, Elio de Angelis finished fourth in his Lotus, with Keke Rosberg fifth in his Fittipaldi and Didier Pironi sixth in his Ligier.

Jones' and Reutemann's podium finishes enabled the Williams team to secure their first Constructors' Championship with two races remaining.

Classification

Qualifying

Race

Championship standings after the race 

Drivers' Championship standings

Constructors' Championship standings

References

Italian Grand Prix
Italian Grand Prix
Grand Prix
Italian Grand Prix
Imola Circuit